Mount Rooper is a coastal locality in the Whitsunday Region, Queensland, Australia.

Geography 
Mount Rooper is a mountainous headland with three main peaks which are (from north to south) Notch Hill, Mount Merkara, and Mount Rooper (221 metres). Little named the mountain after the Rooper Inlet which it overlooks to the south (near present-day Shute Harbour), which was in turn named by Maclear in May 1881 after Lieutenant Henry E. Rooper on HMS Alert.

All of the locality is a protected area, mostly within Conway National Park except for the south-eastern area which is in Conway Conservation Park.

Proserpine-Shute Harbour Road follows the south-western boundary of the locality providing access to Shute Harbour on the southern side of the headland.

History 
Mount Rooper comprises part of the former locality of Jubilee.

References

External links

Whitsunday Region
Coastline of Queensland
Localities in Queensland